Karim Zaza (born 9 January 1975) is a Moroccan former professional footballer and current goalkeeper coach of Vendsyssel FF.

Born in Denmark to a Moroccan father and Danish mother, he established himself as one of the top goalkeepers of Danish football with three consecutive Danish Goalkeeper of the Year awards from 2001 to 2003. He won the Danish Cup twice with F.C. Copenhagen, once with Odense Boldklub (OB) and a the Double with Brøndby IF, as well as another Danish championship with AaB in 2008. He played five games for the Morocco national football team.

Club career
On 21 March 2010, Zaza played his 100th game for AaB in all competitions.

Zaza ended his career at the Danish 1st Division side Vendsyssel FF, retiring in the Summer of 2014, after a knee injury that prevented him from playing.

Coaching career
After his retirement in 2014, Zaza was immediately hired as a goalkeeper coach under Michael Laudrup of Lekhwiya SC in Qatar. Laudrup and his staff, including Zaza, left the club in June 2015. In July 2016, Zaza returned to Vendsyssel FF as an assistant manager under Joakim Mattsson. In early January 2017, Zaza was offered to continue at the club as a goalkeeper coach instead of assistant manager, which he accepted. He left Vendsyssel in January 2020 and returned to Lekhwiya SC in Qatar, which since the last time had been renamed as Al-Duhail SC. He left Qatar in October 2020.

On 1 March 2021, Zaza was appointed goalkeeper coach of Vejle Boldklub on a deal for the rest of the season. On 20 July 2021, Zaza returned to Vendsyssel FF.

Honours
Copenhagen
Danish Cup: 1994–95, 1996–97

OB
Danish Cup: 2001–02

Brøndby
Danish Superliga(): 2004–05
Danish Cup: 2004–05

AaB
Danish Superliga(): 2007–08

Individual
Danish Goalkeeper of the Year: 2001, 2002, 2003

References

External links
AaB profile 
Brøndby IF profile 
F.C. Copenhagen profile 
Superliga stats by Danish Football Association 

1975 births
Riffian people
Living people
Danish men's footballers
Moroccan footballers
Association football goalkeepers
Morocco international footballers
F.C. Copenhagen players
Silkeborg IF players
Odense Boldklub players
Brøndby IF players
Rot-Weiss Essen players
AaB Fodbold players
Vendsyssel FF players
Danish Superliga players
2. Bundesliga players
Danish people of Moroccan descent
Fremad Amager players
People from Brøndby Municipality
Moroccan expatriate footballers
Expatriate footballers in Germany
Moroccan expatriate sportspeople in Denmark
Moroccan expatriate sportspeople in Germany
Sportspeople from the Capital Region of Denmark